Fred A. Busse (March 3, 1866 – July 9, 1914) was the mayor of Chicago, in the U.S. state of Illinois, from 1907 to 1911.

Biography
Busse became a local Republican leader, first elected to the Illinois House of Representatives in 1894 and again in 1896. In 1898, Busse was elected to the Illinois State Senate. He then served as Illinois state treasurer beginning in 1902. In 1905, President Theodore Roosevelt appointed him postmaster of Chicago, a political position at that time (see USPS History). He won the 1907 election for mayor against Democratic incumbent Edward F. Dunne. In business, Busse had been Secretary and Treasurer of the Northwestern Coal Company until 1905.

Mayor of Chicago

Busse was elected mayor of Chicago in 1907.

Busse was sworn-in as mayor on April 15, 1907.

Busse's mayoral tenure is noted for its extensive corruption and presence of organized crime in the city. Busse had connections and was a political ally with a number of organized crime figures. Busse's inaction in the face of growing popular concern led to the formation of several organizations opposed to crime and desirous of cleaning up the city government.  Busse's image was used by at least one brothel owner to promote her business. While reform, both political and moral, was beginning to appear Chicago, Busse noted, "They don't need anyone sleuthing around after me. They can always get me any evening at J.C. Murphy's saloon, Clark Street and North Avenue." By 1907, pressure was strong enough that Busse was forced to appoint a vice commission, although the commission didn't issue a report until Busse was out of office.

As mayor, Busse was a strong supporter of the Plan of Chicago. He and the City Council established a 328-member Chicago Plan Commission in order to realize the plan.

Busse ultimately lost his bid for reelection in 1911 to Democrat Carter Harrison Jr., and was succeeded by Harrison on April 17, 1911.

Death

He died on July 9, 1914 of valvular heart disease at 48 in Chicago, Illinois.   He was buried in Graceland Cemetery.

References

1866 births
1914 deaths
Burials at Graceland Cemetery (Chicago)
Mayors of Chicago
State treasurers of Illinois
Republican Party members of the Illinois House of Representatives
Republican Party Illinois state senators
Postmasters of Chicago
19th-century American politicians